Dante Stipica (born 30 May 1991) is a Croatian professional footballer who plays as a goalkeeper for Ekstraklasa club Pogoń Szczecin. Besides Croatia, he has played in Bulgaria and Poland.

Career

A native of Split, Croatia, from the central Veli Varoš quarter, Stipica passed HNK Hajduk Split's academy, gaining his first senior appearances on loan at Hajduk's third-tier feeder team at the time, GOŠK Kaštel Gomilica, aged 17–18. He made his Prva HNL debut a few weeks before his 19th birthday, in the 5.5.2010 5-2 away win against NK Croatia Sesvete. With the likes of Danijel Subašić, Vjekoslav Tomić, Goran Blažević and Lovre Kalinić in front of him, however, he spent the following few seasons either as third-choice goalkeeper or on loan in various second- and third-tier teams. He got more playing time in the 2013/204 season, after first-choice keeper Lovre Kalinić got injured, but was injured in turn, missing the season's end. Stipica started the 2014/2015 season as first-choice keeper, but conceded his place to the recovered Kalinić after some time. He injured his right knee in October 2014, missing out on the rest of the season, which prompted the signing of Marko Ranilović at mid-season. Stipica signed with Bulgarian club CSKA Sofia in June 2018, where he saw limited action, being the second choice goalkeeper to Vytautas Černiauskas, and left the team in May 2019, after the end of the season.

Honours

Individual
Ekstraklasa Goalkeeper of the Season: 2020-21

Personal life
Stipica studies law at the University of Split.

References

External links
 

1991 births
Living people
Footballers from Split, Croatia
Association football goalkeepers
Croatian footballers
Croatia youth international footballers
Croatia under-21 international footballers
HNK Hajduk Split players
NK Solin players
HNK Zmaj Makarska players
NK Primorac 1929 players
PFC CSKA Sofia players
Pogoń Szczecin players
Croatian Football League players
First Professional Football League (Bulgaria) players
Ekstraklasa players
Croatian expatriate footballers
Expatriate footballers in Bulgaria
Croatian expatriate sportspeople in Bulgaria
Expatriate footballers in Poland
Croatian expatriate sportspeople in Poland